The men's 200 metres at the 2011 IPC Athletics World Championships was held at the QEII Stadium from 22 to 29 January

Medalists

T11
The Men's 200 metres, T11 was held on January 28 and 29

T11 = visual impairment: may range from no light perception in either eye, to light perception with the inability to recognise the shape of a hand.

Results

Heats
Qualification: First 1 in each heat(Q) and the next 2 fastest(q) advance to the final.

Final

Key:   SB = Season Best, CR = Championship Record

T12
The Men's 200 metres, T12 was held on January 27 and 29

T12 = may recognise the shape of a hand, have a visual acuity of 2/60 and/or visual field of less than 5 degrees.

Results

Heats
Qualification: First 1 in each heat(Q) and the next 1 fastest(q) advance to the final.

Key:   DNS = did not start, SB = Season Best, CR = Championship Record

Final

Key:   DNS = did not start

T13
The Men's 200 metres, T13 was held on January 27

T13 = visual impairment: visual acuity ranges from 2/60 to 6/60 and/or has a visual field of more than 5 degrees and less than 20 degrees.

Results

Heats
Qualification: First 3 in each heat(Q) and the next 2 fastest(q) advance to the final.

Key:   DQ = Disqualified, SB = Season Best, R 163.3 = Leaving the lane

Final

Key:   SB = Season Best, DQ = Disqualified

T34
The Men's 200 metres, T34 was held on January 22 and 23

T34 = good functional strength, minimal limitation or control problems in the arms or trunk, compete in a wheelchair or from a throwing frame.

Results

Heats
Qualification: First 3 in each heat(Q) and the next 2 fastest(q) advance to the final.

Final

Key:   R 163.3 = Leaving the lane, DQ = disqualified

T35
The Men's 200 metres, T35 was held on January 22

T35 = good static balance, problems in dynamic balance. May need assistive device for walking, not when standing.

Results

Final

T36
The Men's 200 metres, T36 was held on January 26 and 27

T36 = walk without assistance or assistive devices, more control problems with upper than lower limbs. All four limbs are involved, dynamic balance often better than static balance.

Results

Heats
Qualification: First 3 in each heat(Q) and the next 2 fastest(q) advance to the final.

Key:   SB = Season Best, AR = Area Record, DNF = did not finish

Final

T37
The Men's 200 metres, T37 was held on January 25 and 26

T37 = spasticity in an arm and leg on the same side, good functional ability on the other side, better development, good arm and hand control.

Results

Heats
Qualification: First 3 in each heat(Q) and the next 2 fastest(q) advance to the final.

Key:   162.7 = False start, DQ = disqualified

Final

Key:   WR = World Record, SB = Season Best, AR = Area Record

T38
The Men's 200 metres, T38 was held on January 25 and 26

T38 = meet the minimum disability criteria for athletes with cerebral palsy, head injury or stroke, a limitation in function that impacts on sports performance.

Results

Heats
Qualification: First 3 in each heat(Q) and the next 2 fastest(q) advance to the final.

Key:   R 162.7 = False start, DQ = Disqualified

Final

Key:   CR = Championship Record, SB = Season Best, AR = Area Record

T42
The Men's 200 metres, T42 was held on January 23 and 24

T42 = single above knee amputation or equivalent impairment.

Results

Heats
Qualification: First 3 in each heat(Q) and the next 2 fastest(q) advance to the final.

Final

Key:   CR = Championship Record, SB = Season Best, AR = Area Record

T44
The Men's 200 metres, T44 was held on January 23 and 24

T44 = single below knee amputation, or equivalent impairment.

Also T43 classified athletes competed in this event: double below knee amputations or equivalent impairments.

Results

Heats
Qualification: First 3 in each heat(Q) and the next 2 fastest(q) advance to the final.

Key:   R 163.3 = Leaving the lane, R 162.7 = False start, DNF = did not finish, DQ = disqualified

Final

Key:   SB = Season Best, AR = Area Record

T46
The Men's 200 metres, T46 was held on January 23 and 24

T46 = single above or below elbow amputation or equivalent impairment.

Also T45 classified athletes competed in this event: double arm amputations above or below the elbow or equivalent impairment.

Yohansson Nascimento set a world record for athletes with a T45 classification, with a time of 22.35.

Results

Heats
Qualification: First 3 in each heat(Q) and the next 2 fastest(q) advance to the final.

Key:   DNS = did not start

Final

Key:   WR = World Record, AR = Area Record, SB = Season Best

T51
The Men's 200 metres, T51 was held on January 22

T51 = a weakness in shoulder function, can bend but not straighten the elbow joint, no trunk or leg function, no movement in the fingers, can bend wrists backwards but not forwards.

Results

Final

Key:   CR = Championship Record

T52
The Men's 200 metres, T52 was held on January 22

T52 = good shoulder, elbow and wrist function, poor to normal finger flexion and extension, no trunk or leg function.

Results

Final

Key:   SB = Season Best, DQ = Disqualified, R 163.3 = Leaving the lane

T53
The Men's 200 metres, T53 was held on January 25 and 26

T53 = normal upper limb function, no abdominal, leg or lower spinal function.

Results

Heats
Qualification: First 3 in each heat(Q) and the next 2 fastest(q) advance to the final.

Key:   DQ = Disqualified, R 163.3 = Leaving the lane

Final

Key:   CR = Championship Record

T54
The Men's 200 metres, T54 was held on January 24, 25 and 26

T54 = normal upper limb function, partial to normal trunk function, may have significant function of the lower limbs.

Results

Heats
Qualification: First 3 in each heat(Q) and the next 4 fastest(q) advance to the final.

Key:   DQ = Disqualified, R 163.3 = Leaving the lane, 162.7 = False start, 125.5 = Warning by unsporting manner

Semifinals
Qualification: First 3 in each heat(Q) and the next 2 fastest(q) advance to the final.

Key:   SB = Season Best, DQ = Disqualified, R = IAAF rule, 163.3 = Leaving the lane

Final

Key:   SB = Season Best

See also
List of IPC world records in athletics

References
General
Schedule and results, Official site of the 2011 IPC Athletics World Championships
IPC Athletics Classification Explained, Scottish Disability Sport
Specific

External links
ParalympicSport.TV on YouTube
2011 IPC Athletics World Championships: Men's 200m T13
2011 IPC Athletics World Championships: Men's 200m T36
IPC Athletics World Championships: Men's 200m T37
2011 IPC Athletics World Championships: Men's 200m T38
2011 IPC Athletics World Championships: Men's 200m T46
2011 IPC Athletics World Championships: Men's 200m T51
IPC Athletics World Championships: Men's 200m T53
2011 IPC Athletics World Championships: Men's 200m T54

200 metres
200 metres at the World Para Athletics Championships